KHMM-CD, UHF digital channel 23, was a low-powered, Class A MTV Tres-affiliated television station licensed to Hanford, California, United States. Founded April 23, 1992, the station was owned by Caballero Television Texas, L.L.C.

The station's license was cancelled by the Federal Communications Commission (FCC) on February 13, 2015, as the station had been silent since January 29, 2014 and did not file an application for license renewal.

External links
Tres official site

HMM-CD
Television channels and stations established in 1992
Low-power television stations in the United States
Defunct television stations in the United States
Television channels and stations disestablished in 2015
HMM-CD
1992 establishments in California
2015 disestablishments in California